Plinia yasuniana is a species of plant in the family Myrtaceae. It is endemic to the understory of the Amazonian rainforest in Yasuni National Park in north-east Ecuador. The plant is a shrub that grows to between 1 and 3 metres tall. It produces cauliflorous, white flowers around 4 to 6mm long and edible, yellow fruits around 30mm in diameter, between August and November. It is named after the national park in which it was discovered in 2009.

References

yasuniana
Crops originating from the Americas
Tropical fruit
Fruits originating in South America
Cauliflory
Fruit trees
Berries